Robert Reed "Bob" Shahan (October 18, 1939 – August 14, 2020) was bishop of the Episcopal Diocese of Arizona from 1992 to 2004.

Biography
Shahan was born in Elkhart, Kansas. He studied at the University of Kansas and earned a master's degree in business administration from Michigan State University. He earned his PhD in organizational development from Northwestern University in 1979. In 1994, Seabury-Western Theological Seminary awarded him a Doctorate of Divinity.

Shahan spent a number of years as an officer in the US Navy and then worked as a market analyst for Hershey Foods Corporation. Later he studied at the Nashotah House and graduated with a Master of Divinity in 1973. He was ordained deacon on May 19, 1973, and priest on November 24, 1973. He served parishes in Michigan, Illinois, South Carolina, and Kansas, and has taught preaching and church administration at Seabury-Western Theological Seminary. Prior to his election, he was the Dean of Grace Cathedral in Topeka, Kansas. He was elected Bishop of Arizona on May 2, 1992 on the fifth ballot during a special diocesan convention. He was consecrated bishop on October 3, 1992, by Presiding Bishop Edmond L. Browning. He retired in 2004.

Shahan died on August 14, 2020.

References

External links
 Epistle From Arizona

1939 births
2020 deaths
People from Elkhart, Kansas
Military personnel from Kansas
Nashotah House alumni
University of Michigan alumni
Northwestern University alumni
University of Kansas alumni
Episcopal bishops of Arizona